Hong In-young (born October 27, 1985) is a South Korean actress. Hong represented her country at the 2005 edition of the Hong Kong-based Miss Asia Pageant, where she won Miss Photogenic and placed first runner-up. Among her prizes was a contract with pageant organizer ATV, then upon its expiration, she returned to South Korea to further her career.

Filmography

Television series

Music video

Awards and nominations

References

External links
 
 

1985 births
Living people
21st-century South Korean actresses
South Korean television actresses
South Korean people of Chinese descent